Tarkhanawali  is a village in Kapurthala district of Punjab State, India. The village is administrated by a Sarpanch who is an elected representative of village.

Transport 
Dhilwan Rail Way Station, Beas Rail Way Station are the very nearby railway stations to Tarkhanawali however, Jalandhar City Rail Way station is 34 km away from the village. The village is 61 km away from Sri Guru Ram Dass Jee International Airport in Amritsar and the another nearest airport is Pathankot Airport in Pathankot which is located 92 km away also Sahnewal Airport  is the another nearest airport which is 94 km away in Amritsar from the village.

References

External links
  Villages in Kapurthala
 Kapurthala Villages List

Villages in Kapurthala district